Saint Pierre Island is a self-governing territorial overseas collectivity of France, situated in the northwestern Atlantic Ocean near Canada.

Saint Pierre Island (French: Île Saint-Pierre) may also refer to:
St. Pierre Island, Farquhar, Seychelles
St. Pierre Island, Praslin, Seychelles

See also
Saint Peter Island (disambiguation)
St. Peter's Island, Switzerland